Phrynetopsis variegata is a species of beetle in the family Cerambycidae. It was described by Reiche in 1849. It is known from Ethiopia.

References

Endemic fauna of Ethiopia
Phrynetini
Beetles described in 1849